James II of Bourbon-La Marche (1370 – 1438 in Besançon) was count of La Marche. He was captured at the battle of Nicopolis in 1396, later being ransomed. In 1403, James led an attack on English soil and burned Plymouth. He married Joanna of Naples in 1415, and was largely unpopular being imprisoned then forced to leave the kingdom of Naples in 1419. James relinquished his titles and became a monk in 1435. He died in 1438.

Early life

Born in 1370, James was the first son of John I, Count of La Marche and Catherine of Vendôme. He first bore arms in the crusade against the Ottomans which culminated in the Battle of Nicopolis, and was captured and ransomed. After returning to France, he commanded a force which invaded England in support of Owain Glyndŵr. His troops burned Plymouth in 1403, but twelve ships of his fleet were lost in a storm while returning to France in 1404.

James was an adherent of John the Fearless and foe of the Armagnac party. However, his affairs in France were interrupted by a sojourn abroad. In 1415, the barons of the Kingdom of Naples arranged his marriage to Joanna II of Naples. It was hoped James would break the power of her court favorites, Pandolfo Alopo and Muzio Sforza. He was not given the title King, but was referred to as Vicar General, Duke of Calabria, and Prince of Taranto.  James had Alopo executed and imprisoned Sforza, but also kept the queen in confinement and aspired to personal rule. The indignant barons captured and imprisoned him in 1416; he was compelled to free Sforza and resign the kingship, and was ejected from the kingdom in 1419.

Returning to France, James fought against the English for Charles VII of France in 1428 and was  made Governor of Languedoc.

In 1435, James resigned his titles and became a Franciscan friar, dying in 1438.

Marriage
In 1406 in Pamplona, James married Beatrix d'Évreux, daughter of Charles III of Navarre and Eleanor of Castile. The couple had three children:
 Isabelle (1408 – after 1445), a nun at Besançon
 Marie (1410 – after 1445), a nun at Amiens
 Eleanor of Bourbon-La Marche (Burlada, Navarre, 1407 – after 21 August 1464), married Bernard d'Armagnac, Count of Pardiac (d. 1462)

In 1415, James married Joanna II of Naples. They had no children.

References

Sources

1370 births
1438 deaths
James
Kings consort
Bourbon, James II of
James 1
French Franciscans
Royal consorts of Naples
Counts of Castres
14th-century peers of France
15th-century peers of France
People of the Hundred Years' War
Christians of the Battle of Nicopolis